Haruta (written: 春田) is a Japanese surname and occasional given name. Notable people with the surname include:

 (born 1955), Japanese actor
 (born 1985), Japanese manga artist

See also
, train station in Nakagawa-ku, Nagoya, Aichi Prefecture, Japan

Japanese-language surnames